Otto Becker (31 December 1887 – 30 March 1970) was a Danish fencer. He competed in the individual and team épée events at the 1908 Summer Olympics.

References

1887 births
1970 deaths
Danish male fencers
Olympic fencers of Denmark
Fencers at the 1908 Summer Olympics
Sportspeople from Copenhagen